Estriol 3-glucuronide, or oestriol 3-glucuronide, also known as estriol 3-β-D-glucosiduronic acid, is a natural, steroidal estrogen and a glucuronic acid (β-D-glucopyranuronic acid) conjugate of estriol. It is found in the urine of women as a reversibly formed metabolite of estriol. The positional isomer of estriol 3-glucuronide, estriol 16α-glucuronide, also occurs as an endogenous metabolite of estriol, but to a much greater extent in comparison.

See also
 Estrogen conjugate
 Estradiol glucuronide
 Estrone glucuronide
 Estradiol sulfate
 Estrone sulfate
 Lipoidal estradiol
 Catechol estrogen

References

External links
 Metabocard for Estradiol 3-Glucuronide - Human Metabolome Database

Estriol esters
Estrogens
Glucuronide esters
Hormones of the hypothalamus-pituitary-gonad axis
Hormones of the pregnant female
Human metabolites
Prodrugs
Sex hormones